Mutukula, sometimes spelled as Mtukula, is a small town in Missenyi District, Kagera Region, in northwestern Tanzania, at the border with Uganda. Formerly, the settlement on the border was known as Kyebisagazi, and Mutukula was a kilometre to the south on the east side of the Masaka-Bukoba Road (B8).

Location

Population
The 2012 estimated population of Mutukula, Tanzania, was about 5,000. The immediately adjacent town in Uganda is about three times the size.

See also
Mutukula, Uganda
Kyaka
Kagera Region

References

External links
 

Cities in the Great Rift Valley
Missenyi District
Kagera Region
Populated places in Kagera Region
Tanzania–Uganda border crossings